is a Japanese film and television actress.

Career
Takanashi starred in the 2007 film adaptation of the Japanese novel Goth as one of the lead characters, Yoru Morino. She starred in the 2009 Super Sentai series Samurai Sentai Shinkenger as one of the lead characters, Mako Shiraishi/Shinken Pink.  She starred in Kamen Rider W Returns in July 2011. Rin Takanashi is part of the gravure idol group, Pink Jam Princess, with four others.

She co-starred with Ryo Kase in Abbas Kiarostami's 2012 film Like Someone in Love.

Filmography

Films
 Goth (2008)
 Samurai Sentai Shinkenger The Movie: The Fateful War (2009)
 Samurai Sentai Shinkenger vs. Go-onger: GinmakuBang!! (2010)
 Samurai Sentai Shinkenger Returns (2010)(V-Cinema)
 Tensou Sentai Goseiger vs. Shinkenger: Epic on Ginmaku (2011)
 Kamen Rider W Returns (2011)
 Like Someone in Love (2012)
 Isn't Anyone Alive? (2012)
 Love for Beginners (2012)
 Eve's Lover (2013)
 It All Began When I Met You (2013)
 Killers (2014)
 My Hawaiian Discovery (2014)
 Tanemaku Tabibito: Yume no Tsugigi (2016)
 The Door into Summer (2021), Midori Satō
 Cottontail (2022), Satsuki

Television
 Detective School Q (2007)
 Rookies (2008)
 Tetsudō Musume: Girls Be Ambitious! (2008)
 Kamen Rider Decade (2009) episodes 24 & 25
 Samurai Sentai Shinkenger (2009-2010)
 Neo Ultra Q (2013)
 The Legend of Aterui (2013)
 Hokago Groove (2013)
 Hanako to Anne (2014)
 Tokyo Guard Center (2014)
 Higanbana: Onnatachi no Hanzai File (2014)
 Flashback (2014)
 Masshiro (2015)
 Dr.Rintarō (2015)
 Red Cross: Onna Tachi no Akagami (2015)
 Honto ni Atta Kowai Hanashi Natsu no Tokubetsu-hen 2015 (2015)
 5-ji Kara 9-ji Made: Watashi ni Koi Shita Obōsan (2015)
 Higanbana (2016)
 Fukigen na Kajitsu (2016)
 Aino Kekkon Soudanjo (2017)
 Koi ga Heta demo Ikitemasu (2017)
 Segodon (2018), Fuki
 DCU (2022), Akari Wakabayashi (Ep. 1)

References

External links
 
 

Japanese film actresses
Japanese television actresses
Japanese television personalities
1988 births
Actors from Chiba Prefecture
Living people
People from Funabashi
Stardust Promotion artists
21st-century Japanese actresses